Albert Edward Shears (12 May 1900 – April quarter 1954) was an English footballer who played as a defender.

References

External links
 LFC History profile

1900 births
1954 deaths
English footballers
Footballers from Newcastle upon Tyne
English Football League players
Preston North End F.C. players
Doncaster Rovers F.C. players
Aberdare Athletic F.C. players
Liverpool F.C. players
Tranmere Rovers F.C. players
Wigan Borough F.C. players
Barnsley F.C. players
Aldershot F.C. players
Morecambe F.C. players
Leyland Motors F.C. players
Association football defenders